is a former Japanese football player. His younger brother, Tōru, is an actor.

Playing career
Baba was born in Itabashi, Tokyo on January 22, 1984. He joined J1 League club FC Tokyo from youth team in 2002. He got an opportunity to play during the first season and played many matches as offensive midfielder in 2003. In 2004, FC Tokyo won the J.League Cup, the first title in the club's history. In 2008, he moved to JEF United Chiba. Although he initially played many matches as a substitute midfielder, the club results were sluggish and che did not play much in May. In August 2008, he moved to the J2 League club Montedio Yamagata. He played many matches as a regular player and Montedio won second place in the 2008 season. Montedio was promoted to J1 for the first time in the club's history at the end of 2009, and he left the club at the end of the 2008 season. In August 2009, he joined the J2 club Tokyo Verdy. However he did not play much and left the club at the end of the 2009 season. After a year and a half without playing, he moved to South Korea and joined Daejeon Citizen. He retired at the end of the 2013 season.

Club statistics

References

External links

 

1984 births
Living people
Association football people from Tokyo
Japanese footballers
J1 League players
J2 League players
K League 1 players
FC Tokyo players
JEF United Chiba players
Montedio Yamagata players
Tokyo Verdy players
Daejeon Hana Citizen FC players
Japanese expatriate footballers
Japanese expatriate sportspeople in South Korea
Association football midfielders